Valeri Georgiev (born 28 July 1984) is a Bulgarian footballer, who currently plays as a defender for Vihren Sandanski.

Career
He started his career in home town Blagoevgrad in local team Pirin. On 3 March 2005 Valeri made his official debut in the Bulgarian top division in a match against Spartak Varna. He played for 8 minutes. The result of the match was a 2:0 win for Pirin. Up to the end of season 2004/05 Georgiev played in only 3 matches. In June 2005 he was transferred to FC Vihren Sandanski for a fee of 20 000 € and fast becomes part of the titular team. From 2008 Valeri Georgiev is a captain of Vihren.

References

1984 births
Living people
Bulgarian footballers
First Professional Football League (Bulgaria) players
OFC Pirin Blagoevgrad players
OFC Vihren Sandanski players
PFC Lokomotiv Plovdiv players
FC Montana players
FC Septemvri Simitli players
Association football defenders
Sportspeople from Blagoevgrad